Events in the year 1860 in Brazil.

Incumbents
Monarch – Pedro II.
Prime Minister – Baron of Uruguaiana.

Events

Births
 29 June - Júlio de Castilhos

Deaths

References

 
1860s in Brazil
Years of the 19th century in Brazil
Brazil
Brazil